Annaburg is a small town in Wittenberg district in Saxony-Anhalt, Germany. It was the seat of the former Verwaltungsgemeinschaft Annaburg-Prettin.

Constituent communities 
The town Annaburg consists of the following Ortschaften or municipal divisions:

Annaburg
Axien
Bethau
Groß Naundorf
Labrun
Lebien
Löben
Plossig
Premsendorf
Prettin
Purzien

History 
In the 13th century, the Ascanians built a hunting lodge on the site of today's Annaburg. This stately edifice, however, burnt down in 1422. Duke Albrecht III of Saxony-Wittenberg found himself inside the lodge when it caught fire. He and his wife escaped through a window clad only in their night clothes. The fire killed many of Albrecht's entourage, and indeed it claimed his life too, a few days later as a result of his injuries. This actually influenced the region's history, as Albrecht had no heir. With his death, the Ascanian dynasty came to an end.

In 1498, a zoölogical garden was built.

Until 1572, Annaburg was called Lochau and was, until it was abolished for good in 1821, the seat of the Amt of Annaburg. In 1550, Lochau was home to 40 men who owned land, among them eight draught cattle raisers, one feudal judge, nine gardeners and 22 "suburbanites" who lived somewhere just outside Lochau.

The first Saxon court pharmacy is also to be found in Annaburg.

The Elector August's wife was Anna of Denmark), Danish King Christian III's daughter. For her, the stately home – and thereby also the town – were renamed. Since 1762, the aforesaid residence has been the site of a military youth institute in which more than 500 pupils aged 11 to 15 have been educated for free by military personnel of Protestant (evangelisch) faith. Furthermore, there existed another junior officer preparatory school in a newly built barracks.

In July 1754, Johann Christian Noack, "der Malificant" (i.e. "the Wrongdoer") was put to death on the breaking wheel and left there to deter others from a life of evil deeds. It was one of the last such executions.

From 1780, the Amt actuary, Christian August Seidel, ran a mulberry orchard in Annaburg.

After losing town rights in the 17th century, they were granted Annaburg once again in 1939.

In 1942, Annaburg served as the holding camp of Indian POWs of the British Indian Army, captured in the North African campaigns. This was done at the behest of the Indian nationalist leader, Subhas Chandra Bose; and as a staging ground to create a Free India Legion (eventually absorbed under oath to the German army) to fight for Indian independence from British rule.

Personalities 
 Justus Christian Thorschmidt (1688–1738), clergyman and historian
 Frederick III, Elector of Saxony (1463-1525), also Frederick the Wise, Elector of Saxony, resided in Lochau from about 1500 and died here in 1525

 Anne of Denmark, Electress of Saxony (1532-1585), called  Mother Anna , Electress of Saxony and wife of Augustus I. Saxony, named after the town Annaburg, resided in the newly built castle Lochau (later Annaburg), castle Annaburg housed the first Saxon court pharmacy
 Michael Stifel (1487-1567), theologian, mathematician and reformer, was collaborator of Martin Luther and worked as pastor in Lochau (now Annaburg)

References

External links 

 
Wittenberg (district)